Peggy Beer (born 15 September 1969 in East Berlin) is a retired German heptathlete. Her personal best was 6531 points, achieved at the 1990 European Championships in Split. This ranks her tenth among German heptathletes, behind Sabine Braun, Sabine Paetz, Ramona Neubert, Anke Behmer-Vater, Heike Drechsler, Ines Schulz, Sibylle Thiele, Heike Tischler and Mona Steigauf.

She competed at the Hypo-Meeting twice in her career, coming fifth in 1995 with 6363 points then third with 6382 points in 1998.

International competitions

References

1969 births
Living people
People from East Berlin
Athletes from Berlin
German heptathletes
East German heptathletes
Olympic athletes of Germany
Athletes (track and field) at the 1992 Summer Olympics
Athletes (track and field) at the 1996 Summer Olympics
World Athletics Championships athletes for Germany
European Athletics Championships medalists